Kalthof may refer to:
a quarter of Iserlohn, Germany
the German name for Rizhskoye, part of Kaliningrad, Russia
the German name for Rydzówka, Elbląg County, Poland
Kalthoff gunsmiths